Blowing may refer to:
Air
Breath
Blowing by a whale, from blowhole (anatomy)

Industrial processes
Blowing (glassmaking)
Blowing (textile finishing)
Dry blowing, method to extract gold particles from dry soil without the use of water
Melt blowing, fabrication method of micro-and nanofibers through extrusion

Other
Blowing (album), Japanese-language album by Tokio